Wharton Esherick (July 15, 1887 – May 6, 1970) was an American sculptor who worked primarily in wood, especially applying the principles of sculpture to common utilitarian objects. Consequently, he is best known for his sculptural furniture and furnishings. Esherick was recognized in his lifetime by his peers as the “dean of American craftsmen” for his leadership in developing nontraditional designs and for encouraging and inspiring artists and artisans by example. Esherick’s influence is evident in the work of contemporary artisans, particularly in the Studio Craft Movement. His home and studio in Malvern, Pennsylvania, are part of the Wharton Esherick Museum, which has been listed as a National Historic Landmark since 1993.

Life and career 
Born in Philadelphia, Esherick studied at the Pennsylvania Museum School of Industrial Art (now the University of the Arts) and at the Pennsylvania Academy of the Fine Arts. He married Leticia Nofer (1892–1975) in 1912. In 1913 the couple moved to a farmhouse near Malvern, Pennsylvania, to pursue his painting career, grow their own food, and raise their children in accordance with the precepts of the progressive education movement. They became immersed in the progressive education movement while visiting the Marietta Johnson School of Organic Education in Fairhope, Alabama, in 1919. It was Marietta Johnson who first suggested that Esherick explore woodcarving. He began carving decorative frames for his paintings in 1920, which led to making woodcut prints and finally to sculpture. 

Esherick’s early furniture was derived from the Arts and Crafts style and decorated with surface carving. In the late 1920s he abandoned carving on his furniture, focusing instead on the pure form of the pieces as sculpture. In the 1930s he was producing sculpture and furniture influenced by the organicism of Rudolf Steiner, as well as by German Expressionism and Cubism. The angular and prismatic forms of the latter two movements gave way to the free-form curvilinear shapes for which he is best known. His work was also part of the painting event in the art competition at the 1932 Summer Olympics.

From furniture and furnishings he progressed to interiors, the most famous being the Curtis Bok House (1935–37). Though the house was demolished in 1989, Esherick’s work was saved and the fireplace and adjacent music room doors can be seen in the Philadelphia Museum of Art, and the foyer stairs in the Wolfsonian Museum in Miami, Florida.

In 1940 the architect George Howe used Esherick’s Spiral Stair (1930) and Esherick furniture to create the “Pennsylvania Hill House” exhibit in the New York World’s Fair “America at Home” Pavilion. Esherick’s work was featured in a 1958 retrospective at the Museum of Contemporary Craft and in the 1972 “Woodenworks” exhibition at the Renwick Gallery. He exhibited hundreds of times during his life, and his work is in the permanent collections of the Philadelphia Museum of Art, the Pennsylvania Academy of the Fine Arts, the Metropolitan Museum of Art, the Whitney Museum, the Museum of Fine Arts of Boston, and many other museums and galleries. Most of his work remains in private hands.

His home and studio, outside of Valley Forge, Pennsylvania, were his largest piece of art. The buildings evolved over forty years as Esherick lived and worked there. He continued working on the studio until his death in 1970. In 1972 the studio was converted into the Wharton Esherick Museum. The property, known as the Wharton Esherick Studio, was declared a National Historic Landmark in 1993. The Diamond Rock Schoolhouse, which served as Esherick's painting studio during the 1920s, was acquired by the Wharton Esherick Museum in 2019.

Esherick was the father of Ruth Bascom (wife of architect Mansfield Bascom, curator emeritus of the Wharton Esherick Museum) and the uncle of American architect Joseph Esherick.

See also
 Margaret Esherick House, with a kitchen designed by Wharton Esherick
 Wharton Esherick Museum

References

Further reading
 Bascom, Mansfield, Wharton Esherick: The Journey of a Creative Mind, New York, Abrams, 2010, .
 Clark, Emily, Stuffed Peacocks, by Emily Clark; Woodcuts by Wharton Esherick, New York, London, Knopf, 1927.
 Eisenhauer, Paul, ed., Wharton Esherick's Illuminated and Illustrated Song of the Broad-Axe by Walt Whitman, Atglen, Pennsylvania, Schiffer Publishing, 2011.
Eisenhauer, Paul, and Lynne Farrington, eds., Wharton Esherick and the Birth of the American Modern, Atglen, Pennsylvania, Schiffer Publishing, 2010.
 Esherick, Wharton, and Gene Rochberg, Drawings by Wharton Esherick, New York, Van Nostrand Reinhold, 1978.
 Renwick Gallery, Woodenworks; Furniture Objects by Five Contemporary Craftsmen: George Nakashima, Sam Maloof, Wharton Esherick, Arthur Espenet Carpenter, Wendell Castle, St. Paul, Minnesota Museum of Art, 1972.
 Silverman, Sharon Hernes, "A Passion for Wood", Pennsylvania Heritage, vol. 23, no. 4, 1997.
 Wharton Esherick Museum, The Wharton Esherick Museum, Studio and Collection, Paoli, Pennsylvania, Wharton Esherick Museum, 1977.
 Wharton Esherick Museum, The Wharton Esherick Museum, Studio and Collection, 3rd ed., Atglen, Pennsylvania, Schiffer Publishing, 2010.

External links
 Official website of the Wharton Esherick Museum

1887 births
1970 deaths
Artists from Pennsylvania
Sculptors from Pennsylvania
American woodworkers
American printmakers
University of the Arts (Philadelphia) alumni
People from Paoli, Pennsylvania
Olympic competitors in art competitions
Arts and Crafts movement artists
American furniture makers
Artists from Philadelphia
Architects from Philadelphia
20th-century American architects
20th-century American male artists
20th-century American sculptors
20th-century American painters